Juri Lotman (28 February 1922 – 28 October 1993) was a prominent Russian-Estonian literary scholar, semiotician, and historian of Russian culture, who worked at the University of Tartu. He was elected a member of the British Academy (1977), Norwegian Academy of Science and Letters (1987), Royal Swedish Academy of Sciences (1989) and Estonian Academy of Sciences (1990). He was a founder of the Tartu–Moscow Semiotic School. The number of his printed works exceeds 800 titles. His archive (which is now kept at the University of Tallinn and at the Tartu University Library) which includes his correspondence with a number of Russian and Western intellectuals, is immense.

Biography
Juri Lotman was born in the Jewish intellectual family of lawyer Mikhail Lotman and Sorbonne-educated dentist Aleksandra Lotman in Petrograd, Russia. His elder sister Inna Obraztsova graduated from Leningrad Conservatory and became a composer and lecturer of musical theory, his younger sister Victoria Lotman was a prominent cardiologist, and his third sister Lidia Lotman was a scholar of Russian literature of the second half of the 19th century on staff at the Institute for Russian Literature of the Russian Academy of Science (Pushkin House) (she lived in Saint-Petersburg).

Lotman graduated from the secondary school in 1939 with excellent marks and was admitted to Leningrad State University without having to pass any exams. There he studied philology, which was a choice he made due to Lidia Lotman's university friends (actually he attended university lectures in philology whilst he was still at secondary school). His professors at university were the renowned lecturers and academicians – Gukovsky, Azadovsky, Tomashevsky and Propp. He was drafted in 1940 and  during World War II served as a radio operator in the artillery. Demobilized from the army in 1946, he returned to his studies in the university and received his diploma with distinction in 1950. His first published research papers focused on Russian literary and social thought of the 18th and 19th century.

Unable to find an academic position in Leningrad due to anti-Semitism (he was unable to apply for a PhD program), Lotman went to Estonia in 1950 and from 1954 began his work as a lecturer in the Department of Russian literature of Tartu University and later became head of the department.

In the early '60s Lotman established academic contacts with a group of structuralist linguists in Moscow, and invited them in the first Summer School on Secondary Modeling Systems, that took place in Kääriku from 19th to 29 August 1964. The group gathered at the first summer school later developed into what is now known as the Tartu–Moscow Semiotic School. Among participants of the summer school, and later members of the Tartu–Moscow school, were such names as Boris Uspensky, Vyacheslav Ivanov, Vladimir Toporov, Mikhail Gasparov, Alexander Piatigorsky, Isaak I. Revzin and Georgii Lesskis. As a result of their collective work, they established a theoretical framework for the study of the semiotics of culture.

This school has been widely known for its journal Sign Systems Studies, published by Tartu University Press ("Труды по знаковым системам") and currently the oldest semiotics journal in the world (established in 1964). Lotman studied the theory of culture, Russian literature, history, semiotics and semiology (general theories of signs and sign systems), semiotics of cinema, arts, literature, robotics, etc. In these fields, Lotman has been one of the most widely cited authors. His major study in Russian literature was dedicated to Pushkin; among his most influential works in semiotics and structuralism are Semiotics of Cinema, Analysis of the Poetic Text and The Structure of the Artistic Text. In 1984, Lotman coined the term semiosphere.
In 1991 he received the Gold Medal of Philology, the highest award for a philological scholar.

Juri Lotman's wife Zara Mints was also a well-known scholar of Russian literature and  Tartu professor. They have three sons:
Mihhail Lotman (born 1952) is professor of semiotics and literary theory at Tartu University, is active in politics and has served as a member of the Riigikogu (Estonian Parliament) as a member of the conservative Res Publica Party.
Grigori Lotman (born 1953) is an artist.
Aleksei Lotman (born 1960) is a biologist, since 2006 he has also been a politician and a member of parliament for the Estonian Greens party (2007–2011).

Bibliography
 1975. Lotman Jurij M.; Uspenskij B.A.; Ivanov, V.V.; Toporov, V.N. and Pjatigorskij, A.M. 1975. "Theses on the Semiotic Study of Cultures (as Applied to Slavic Texts)". In: Sebeok Thomas A. (ed.), The Tell-Tale Sign: A Survey of Semiotics. Lisse (Netherlands): Peter de Ridder, 57–84. 
 1976. Analysis of the Poetic Text. (Translated by D. Barton Johnson.) Ann Arbor (Mich.): Ardis. 
 1976. "The content and structure of the concept of "literature". PTL: A Journal for Descriptive Poetics and Theory of Literature 1(2): 339–356.
 1976. Semiotics of Cinema. (Transl. by Mark Suino.) (Michigan Slavic Contributions.) Ann Arbor: University of Michigan Press, Семиотика кино и проблемы киноэстетики  
 1977. The Structure of the Artistic Text. Translated from the Russian by Gail Lenhoff and Ronald Vroon. (Michigan Slavic Contributions 7.) Ann Arbor: University of Michigan, Department of Slavic Languages and Literatures. 
 1979. "The origin of plot in the light of typology". Poetics Today 1(1–2), 161–184.
 1990. Universe of the Mind: A Semiotic Theory of Culture. (Translated by Ann Shukman, introduction by Umberto Eco.) London & New York: I. B. Tauris & Co Ltd. xiii+288 p. 
 2005. "On the semiosphere". (Translated by Wilma Clark) Sign Systems Studies, 33(1): 205–229.
 2009. Culture and Explosion. (Semiotics, Communication and Cognition 1.) Translated by Wilma Clark, edited by Marina Grishakova.De Gruyter Mouton. 
 2014. Non-Memoirs. Translated and annotated by Caroline Lemak Brickman, edited by Evgenii Bershtein, with an afterword by Caroline Lemak Brickman and Evgenii Bershtein. Dalkey Archive Press: Champaign, London, Dublin. .

See also
 Philosophy in the Soviet Union
 Semiotics
 Literary formalism
 Semiosphere

References

Further reading
Andrews, Edna 2003. Conversations with Lotman: Cultural Semiotics in Language, Literature, and Cognition. Toronto: University of Toronto Press.
Andrews, Edna 2003. The importance of Lotmanian semiotics to sign theory and the cognitive neurosciences.	 Sign Systems Studies 43(2/3): 347–364.
Elkouch, Hassib 2016. Juri Lotman in Arabic: A bibliography. Sign Systems Studies 44(3): 452–455.
Grishakova, Marina, and Silvi Salupere. Theoretical Schools and Circles in the Twentieth-Century Humanities: Literary Theory, History, Philosophy. Routledge, 2015. 
Kull, Kalevi 1999. Towards biosemiotics with Yuri Lotman. Semiotica 127(1/4): 115–131.
Kull, Kalevi 2011. Juri Lotman in English: Bibliography. Sign Systems Studies 39(2/4): 343–356. See.
Kull, Kalevi; Gramigna, Remo 2014. Juri Lotman in English: Updates to bibliography. Sign Systems Studies 42(4): 549–552.
Lepik, Peet 2008. Universals in the Context of Juri Lotman’s Semiotics. (Tartu Semiotics Library 7.) Tartu: Tartu University Press.
Mandelker, Amy 1994. Semiotizing the sphere: Organicist theory in Lotman, Bakhtin, and Vernadsky. Publications of the Modern Language Association 109(3): 385–396.
Shukman, Ann 1977. Literature and Semiotics: A Study of the Writings of Ju. M. Lotman. Amsterdam: North Holland.
Waldstein, Maxim 2008. The Soviet Empire of Signs: A History of the Tartu School of Semiotics. Saarbrücken: VDM Verlag Dr. Müller.

External links

Juri Lotman page at the Semiotics Department of the University of Tartu
Bibliography of English translated works and updates to bibliography
Lotmaniana Tartuensia – biography, bibliography of works in Russian and Estonian , 
ELKOST Intl. literary agency – translation rights in all Lotman's writings
Homepage of the Lotman Institute for Russian and Soviet Culture at the University of Bochum
Intellectual Biography of Juri Lotman at the Gallery of Russian Thinkers (International Society for Philosophers)
Lotman foundation and scholarship

1922 births
1993 deaths
Russian philologists
Estonian scholars
Linguists from Estonia
Writers from Saint Petersburg
Estonian Jews
Russian Jews
Slavists
Academic staff of the University of Tartu
Members of the Estonian Academy of Sciences
Estonian semioticians
20th-century Estonian writers
Burials at Raadi cemetery
Soviet literary historians
Soviet male writers
20th-century male writers
Estonian non-fiction writers
20th-century linguists
20th-century philologists
Male non-fiction writers
Film theorists